MX vs. ATV: On the Edge is a racing video game developed by Tantalus Media and published by THQ for the PlayStation Portable. It was released in 2006.

There are several modes of play covering the entire world of pro ATV and MX racing like Hill climb, FMX, super cross race, and others. In this game, players can drive not only ATVs and MX bikes but dune buggies, golf carts, stadium trucks, monster trucks, and sand rails.

It's a fairly straightforward port of the PS2, Xbox, PC title MX vs. ATV Unleashed which was released in 2005 by THQ.  Besides obvious graphical differences and the addition of several new playable areas, the game lacks the ability to fly airplanes, unlike the console edition of the game.

Reception

The game was met with average reception upon release, as GameRankings gave it a score of 69%, while Metacritic gave it 68 out of 100.

References

External links

2006 video games
Monster truck video games
MX vs. ATV
Racing video games
THQ games
PlayStation Portable games
PlayStation Portable-only games
Tantalus Media games
Multiplayer and single-player video games
Video games developed in the United States